The Western Iowa Conference is a high school athletic conference made up of bigger 1A and smaller 2A schools located mostly in the greater Council Bluffs area. The teams in the conference have a deep-rooted history together. Most of the schools have been with the conference throughout its history.

History
The Western Iowa Conference was organized in 1972 through the merger of the former Tri-County and Southwest Iowa Conferences.  Members of the Tri-County Conference at that time were Carson–Macedonia, Elk Horn–Kimballton, Iowa School for the Deaf, Shelby-Tennant, Treynor, Tri-Center (Neola), Underwood, and Walnut.  The members of the Southwest Iowa Conference then were AvoHa (Avoca), Griswold, Missouri Valley, and Oakland. Competition in the new 12-team conference began in the summer of 1971 with baseball and softball tournaments.  No regular season schedules were played during the 1971–72 school year, but girls and boys basketball tournaments and the traditional wrestling tournament were held in early 1972.

Many changes have occurred since then to turn today’s WIC into an 8-team league.  It remained a 12-team conference until after the 1981–82 school year.  At that time Elk Horn–Kimballton and Walnut dropped out to join the Rolling Hills Conference.  Following the 1982–83 school year, Iowa Deaf dropped out making the WIC a 9-team conference.  After the 1985–86 school year, Carson–Macedonia dropped out, but would eventually join with Oakland to form Riverside.  Then following the 1987–88 school year Shelby-Tennant left the league, but it would join forces with AvoHa a few years later to form what is now known as AHST.  Finally, for the 1990–91 school year, Audubon joined the WIC to make it the 8-team league. 

The league saw a change in membership for the first time in over two decades when Logan–Magnolia and IKM–Manning joined from the Western Valley Activities Conference for the 2013–14 season. Griswold left in 2018-19 for the Corner Conference (Iowa).

List of member schools

References

External links
Official website
http://sites.google.com/a/treynorcardinals.org/wic/

High school sports in Iowa
Sports leagues established in 1972
1972 establishments in Iowa